Trivandrum Rubber Works is a public sector manufacturing industry in Thiruvananthapuram, Kerala, India.
Its manufactured products include, retreaded metals, bonding gum and unvulcanised sheets. It was promoted by Kerala State Industrial Development Corporation (KSIDC).

History
The factory was opened by Sree Chithira Thirunal Balarama Varma, the then King of Travancore Kingdom, to manufacture rubber sheets for tents for the soldiers of the Second World War.

Trivandrum Rubber Works was the first factory to be set up in the public sector in Asia.

References

Companies based in Thiruvananthapuram
1963 establishments in Kerala
State agencies of Kerala
Indian companies established in 1963
Rubber industry
Government-owned companies of Kerala